Christine Marion Fraser (24 March 1938 – 22 November 2002) was a Scottish author of popular fiction.

Background
She was born in Govan, Glasgow, and was raised in a tenement, the eighth child of a shipyard worker and his wife. As a child, she developed a calcium condition and became a wheelchair user for life.

Works
Fraser was best known for her four continuing family sagas, all of them set in Scotland. Her books sold over three and a half million copies, mostly in her native Scotland but also across the English-speaking world. 
 
Her first novel Rhanna was published in 1978 and was followed by seven sequels. The Rhanna series detailed the lives of the residents of a small fictitious Hebridean island of the same name.

Her second series was the five-book King's Croft series, begun in 1986, which was set in 19th century Aberdeenshire. She followed that in 1994 with the Noble series, set in Victorian-era Argyll.

Her fourth and final series, begun in 1998, were the Kinvara stories, four novels about lighthouse keepers on an Outer Hebridean island.

She also wrote a series of autobiographical novels related to her life and upbringing in Scotland.

Bibliography

Rhanna
 Rhanna (1978)
Rhanna at War (1980)
Children of Rhanna (1983)
Return to Rhanna (1984)
Song of Rhanna (1985)
Storm Over Rhanna (1988)
Stranger on Rhanna (1992)
A Rhanna Mystery (1996)

Kings
 King's Croft (1986)
King's Acre (1987)
King's Exile(1989)
King's Close (1991)
King's Farewell (1993)

Noble
Noble Beginnings (1994)
Noble Deeds (1995)
Noble Seed (1997)

Kinvara
Kinvara (1998)
Kinvara Wives (1999)
Kinvara Summer (2000)
Kinvara Affairs (2001)

Autobiographical series
Blue Above the Chimneys (1980)
Roses Round the Door (1986)
Green Are My Mountains (1990)
Beyond the Rainbow (1994)

Other work
Ullin Macbeth (1996)
The Poppy Field (1997) (with Frank Ian Galloway)
Out of the Past (1997)
Wild Is the Day (1997)

References

External links
 Christine Marion Fraser Obituary

1938 births
2002 deaths
Scottish women novelists
Scottish historical novelists
Scottish romantic fiction writers
Writers of historical fiction set in the Middle Ages
Writers of historical romances
20th-century British novelists
Women romantic fiction writers
20th-century British women writers
Women historical novelists